
Who Was? or Who HQ is a series of children's non-fiction books published by Penguin Books. The Who Was?, What Was?, Where Is?, What Is the Story Of? and HQ Now books tell the stories of trailblazers, legends, innovators, cool places, and important events. Covering everything from sports to politics, the Who HQ Now series focuses on trending topics and prominent subjects discussed in the news. , the series had over 250 entrants, sold over 20 million copies, and has been on the New York Times Best Seller list. 

The first four Who Was? books—Who Was Sacagawea?, Who Was Ben Franklin?, Who Was Albert Einstein?, and Who Was Annie Oakley?—were published on February 18, 2002 and Penguin Books publishes about 24 new Who HQ books a year. Example entrants in the series due for publication in 2023 include LeBron James, John McCain, Megan Rapinoe, Simone Biles, Nathan Chen, the story of Nancy Drew and more.

Book format

Every Who was...? book begins with a prologue of sorts. The books generally have 10 chapters but some have up to 13, or even more. After the last chapter, there is a timeline of the book's events, and then the world timeline. At the back of the book, there is a bibliography, which shows the cited sources.  

There are about eighty illustrations in each book—one on almost every page, and always one for each sidebar. The big heads were inspired by the caricatures that used to be drawn for the cover of the New York Times Book Review each week some of the books include who was for people like Stevie wonder Ronald Reagan and Jeff Kinney
.

TV adaptation
In 2017, Netflix ordered a 13-episode variety show based on the books, The Who Was? Show.  The series was developed by Penguin Workshop and FremantleMedia, produced by Rich Korson, and written by Brian McCann, Elliott Kalan, Eric Gilliland, Delaney Yeager, and Tami Sagher.  Each half-hour episode was slated to feature "live-action, animated shorts, improvisations, sketches, musical performances and guest appearances."

References

External links 
 
 

series of children's books